Smør may refer to:

People
 Smør (noble family), a Norwegian medieval family
 Hallvard Jonson Smør (fl. 1368–1372), Norwegian knight
 Jon Smør (1240–1328), Norwegian knight and cabinet minister
 Jon Hallvardson Smør (fl. 1375), Norwegian nobleman
 Jon Svaleson Smør (died 1483), Norwegian knight, regent and cabinet minister
 Svale Jonson Smør (c. 1380–1442), Norwegian knight and cabinet minister
 Torgaut Jonson Smør (fl. 1353–1373), Norwegian nobleman and cabinet minister

See also
 S'more, a North American campfire dessert